Texarkana Independent School District is an urban school district serving  in the Northeast corner of Texas (USA).  It serves the majority of Texarkana, Texas, and the surrounding communities of Wake Village and Nash.  It is the largest school district in Bowie County and the largest district served by the Region VIII Education Service Center.  Texarkana ISD does not service Texarkana, Arkansas-side schools, who are managed by the Texarkana Arkansas Schools under the Arkansas State Government.  It was established in 1889.  Unique among other schools in its region, it accepts transfers from other Texas school districts tuition-free.

In 2009, the school district was rated "academically acceptable" by the Texas Education Agency.

Schools

High schools
Texas High School

Junior high schools
Texas Middle School

Elementary schools
Dunbar Intermediate Center
Theron Jones Early Literacy Center
Highland Park Elementary
Martha & Josh Morriss Mathematics & Engineering Elementary
Nash Elementary
Spring Lake Park Elementary
Wake Village Elementary (1985-86 National Blue Ribbon School) 
Westlawn Elementary
Waggoner Creek Elementary

Alternative Schools
Disciplinary Alternative School
OPTIONS Academic Alternative

See also
List of school districts in Texas

References

External links
Texarkana Independent School District

Texarkana, Texas
School districts in Bowie County, Texas